P. africanus may refer to:
 Panaeolus africanus, a little brown mushroom species
 Paranthodon africanus, a dinosaur species from the middle of the Cretaceous
 Phacochoerus africanus, the warthog, a wild pig species found in Africa
 Proconsul africanus, an extinct primate species of the Miocene
 Pseudoniphargus africanus, a crustacean species in the genus Pseudoniphargus

See also
 Africanus (disambiguation)